Gong Tau: An Oriental Black Magic (Cantonese: 降頭 Gong Tau) is a 2007 Hong Kong horror film directed by Herman Yau.

Plot
CID detective Rockman was sent to Thailand to investigate a case involving the Hong Kong and Thai underground syndicate. During his visit, he meets a sexy table dancer called Elli, and they had a brief but hot, steamy affair. Unexpectedly, Rockman is ordered to return to Hong Kong. Before leaving, he promised Elli he would return, but he never does. Heart broken, Elli felt she was deceived. Rockman never expect his affair would bring the worst luck for him and his family.

Three years later, in Hong Kong, when Rockman was busily investigating a murder case one stormy night, a senior policeman was murdered by a most wanted fugitive Lam Chiu. On the other hand, Rockman's wife broke down after their son died mysteriously. All the major newspapers headlined the two cases, saying the murder and the baby's death were related. Frustrated, Rockman worked closely with Brother Sum well seasoned detective...

External links
 
 Gong Tau: An Oriental Black Magic at the Hong Kong Movie DataBase

Hong Kong horror films
2007 films
2007 horror films
Films directed by Herman Yau
Hong Kong supernatural horror films
2000s Hong Kong films